The Sport Mundi Tournament is a Spanish pre-season women's football invitational charitable tournament held every August in Irun and Hondarribia since 2005.

It is contested by four teams each year, usually including regional powerhouses Athletic Bilbao and Real Sociedad. Athletic is the most successful team in the competition with four titles, followed by Levante UD and Real Sociedad with two each.

Honours

List of finals

External links
Sport Mundi website

Women's football friendly trophies
Spanish football friendly trophies
Irun
2005 establishments in Spain
Recurring sporting events established in 2005
Women's sport in Spain
Sport in Gipuzkoa